Spirama kalaoensis is a species of moth of the family Erebidae. It is found on Sulawesi and Flores.

References

Moths described in 1904
Spirama